The port of Nador is a commercial port on the Mediterranean servicing the Rif area of Northern Morocco.
The port is officially in Beni Ensar / Aït Nsar and shares its piers and entrance with the port of the Spanish enclave Melilla. It is a semi-artificial port using the Bou Areg Lagoon.

Usage
The port is directly connected to the Spanish enclave Melilla: the Port of Melilla uses approximately 70% of the wet area, while Nador port uses the remaining 30% of the south-east area. The port is used as ferry/ro-ro port, dry-bulk and has facilities for hydro-carbons. The ro-ro facilities are used by ferry operators on the route to/from Spain.

In 1994 the operator FerriMaroc opened the line to the Port of Almeria. Before that date one could only sail to the area via Melilla or via the ferry-terminal in Al Hoceima.

Facilities
The operator MarsaMaroc, who operate the main ports in Morocco, offer the following facilities in Nador Port
The port can be divided in three main parts:

Terminal 2
This Terminal 2 is a bulk-goods terminal receiving bulk goods such as ore and billets for the nearby steel mill SONASID and is also used as a (small) fishing port.

Passengers and vehicle piers
Nador Port is now an important ferry terminal for North-Eastern Morocco, with direct daily links to Spain (Almeria and Motril) and weekly connection to France (Sete)
For ferries operating to Europe the port offers  quays for Roll-on/roll-off ferries with elevated foot bridges for foot passengers to cross the car-traffic on different levels and thus not hindering each other at (dis)embarkation with also  depth.

Hydrocarbon port

Train links
Since the Moroccan train operator ONCF opened the branch line Taourirt – Nador in 2009, the port also offers daily train connections to the rest of the country. The train stop Beni Ensar / Aït Nsar Port is the terminus for trains to Tanger and Casablanca via Fez. (see also: Nador railway stations)

Connections

Ferry links to mainland Europe
There are several ferry companies operating daily sailings to and from the Port of Almeria in Spain. The main operators are:
 Africa Morocco Link
 Trasmediterránea
 Grandi Navi Veloci (Nador to Sète in France)
 Balearia (Nador to Sète)

Rail and road connections in Morocco
The branch-line from Taourirt to Nador doesn't terminate in Nador itself but runs to Beni Ensar / Aït Nsar. Beni Ensar / Aït Nsar Port is the terminus station for the branch-line to Taourirt, where it connects to the East-West mainline towards Oujda in the east (no direct connection: change in Taorirt) or via Fez to Tanger or towards Rabat and Casablanca with further connections to Marrakech in the west.

By road the National road N19 gives a direct connection to the city of Nador itself (8 miles) and beyond.

Nearby airports are Melilla Airport and Nador International Airport

References

External links
 Nador Rif News شبكة أخبار الناظور و الريف أريفينو.نت,  www.ariffino.net

Ports and harbours of Morocco
Port